Harpalus caliginosus is a species of ground beetle in the subfamily Harpalinae. It was described by Johan Christian Fabricius in 1775.

References

caliginosus
Beetles described in 1775
Taxa named by Johan Christian Fabricius